Renzo Lucidi was an Italian film editor who worked on more than sixty films between 1940 and 1979. He worked with Orson Welles several times, including editing Othello (1951) and Mr. Arkadin (1955).

Selected filmography
 Marco Visconti (1941)
 Honeymoon (1941)
 Short Circuit (1943)
 Harlem (1943)
 The Barber of Seville (1947)
 The Brothers Karamazov (1947)
 A Night of Fame (1949)
 The Flame That Will Not Die (1949)
The Pirates of Capri (1949)
 The Thief of Venice (1950)
 L' Amore di Norma (1950)
 Othello (1951)
 A Woman Has Killed (1952)
 Son of the Hunchback (1952)
 Milady and the Musketeers (1952)
 Melody of Love (1952)
 Mr. Arkadin (1955)
 The Red Cloak (1955)
 Romanoff and Juliet (1961)
 My Son, the Hero (1962)
 Taras Bulba, the Cossack (1962)
 The Empty Canvas (1963)
 A Man Called Sledge (1970)
 It Can Be Done Amigo (1972)
 Due cuori, una cappella (1975)

References

Bibliography 
 Rosenbaum, Jonathan. Discovering Orson Welles. University of California Press, 2007.

External links 
 

Year of birth unknown
Year of death unknown
Italian film editors